The Plastic Disclosure Project (PDP) is a project working to reduce the environmental impact of the world rising use of plastics in products and packaging. Similar to the Carbon Disclosure Project, PDP encourages measurement, disclosure and management to improve corporate, community and individual accountability on plastic manufacture, use and disposal.

Foundation
PDP was announced at the opening plenary session of the Clinton Global Initiative in 2010 as a preventative project that can help address the issue of plastic waste on a global scale. PDP is a project of Ocean Recovery Alliance.

Goals
 Create a world where plastic can be used, but where there is no environmental impact as a result 
 Use annual reporting and measurement of production or waste creation to bring about better management
 Encourage sustainable business practices around plastic use
 Inspire improved design and innovative solutions for plastic products and packaging

How it works
PDP asks businesses to measure, manage, reduce and benefit from plastic waste to create a world where plastic benefits consumers and businesses without negatively impacting the environment. PDP is based on the principle that to effectively manage and improve efficiency in plastic use, reuse and recycling, businesses must first quantify their plastics. Annual disclosure requests are sent to companies that use plastic for goods and/or services on behalf of socially conscious investors and community stakeholders.

PDP aims to connect solution providers with prospective companies to facilitate design and innovation. All types of organisation are invited to participate in PDP and commit to reducing their plastic footprint.

Company disclosures
Lush (company) became the first PDP Discloser in 2011. In 2012 UC Berkeley became the first university to join PDP. The project will be managed by Campus Recycling and Refuse Services as well as the Office of Sustainability, and the university plans to assign interns to track plastic waste as it leaves campus. Further companies in at least a dozen countries have expressed interest in this project.

At the Plasticity Forum Rio '12, an alliance was formed between Plastic Pollution Coalition and PDP to work with university campuses around the world to reduce their plastic footprint.

Earth People, a Dallas-based environmental consultancy, is the first consultancy to offer plastic assessment and reporting services though PDP for clients.

References

External links
 Plastic Disclosure Project
 Ocean Recovery Alliance

501(c)(3) organizations
Nature conservation organizations based in the United States
Ocean pollution
Plastics and the environment